This is a comparison between Indian states and countries by gross domestic product (PPP). Many of the states of India have large GDP (called gross state product) which would rank highly on a list of countries by GDP.

These figures are based on the World Bank list on List of countries by GDP (PPP) for world GDP, and the States of India by size of economy figures.

2018-2019 (Current Prices)

2005

See also
 GSP of Indian states
 States of India by urban population
 States of India by tax revenues
 States of India by installed power capacity

Region specific
 List of African countries by GDP
 List of Arab League countries by GDP
 List of Asian countries by GDP
 List of European countries by GDP
List of South American countries by GDP
List of North American countries by GDP
 List of Chinese administrative divisions by GDP
 List of Chinese administrative divisions by GDP per capita
Historical specific
 List of countries by GDP estimates for 2006 (nominal)
 List of countries by GDP estimates for 2007 (nominal)
 List of countries by past GDP (nominal) – for the years between 1998 and 2003
 List of countries by past GDP (PPP) – for the periods between 1 CE and 1998 CE

References

Sources
 States of India by size of economy
 World Bank – July 1, 2006

Ranked lists of country subdivisions
GDP (nominal)
Gross domestic product
Economy of India lists